The Women's Twenty20 Cup, known for sponsorship reasons as the Vitality Women's County T20, is a women's Twenty20 cricket competition organised by the England and Wales Cricket Board. Until the end of the 2019 season, teams were organised in tiered divisions, with a national winner; since, teams have been organised into regional groups. 

The competition began in 2009 and now features 35 teams, drawn mainly from the historic counties of England, plus Wales and Scotland. Until 2019, the competition operated alongside the Women's County Championship, but after a restructuring in women's domestic cricket in 2020, from 2021 it became the only official tournament featuring county sides, with regional teams competing in new 50-over, Twenty20 and The Hundred competitions.

As teams competed in regional groups in 2022, with no national finals, there was no overall winner. The last national champions are Warwickshire, who won the 2019 competition. The most successful side in the history of the competition is Kent, with 3 wins.

History
The Women's Twenty20 Cup began in 2009, with teams competing in eight tiered divisions of four. Surrey were the inaugural Division 1 champions. Overall, eight teams have won the tournament, with Kent being the most successful side, winning the tournament three times, in 2011, 2013 and 2016. Berkshire reached the final of the competition three times in a row between 2010 and 2012, but only managed to win the tournament in 2010. After the 2019 season, the 50-over Women's County Championship was ended, in favour of a regionalised structure for domestic women's cricket. However, the Twenty20 Cup was allowed to continue, with central funding from the ECB, until at least 2021, with counties effectively acting as "feeder" teams to the new regional sides. However, the 2020 edition of the tournament was postponed and eventually cancelled due to the COVID-19 pandemic. The tournament returned for 2021, with a regional format, and is set to continue in 2022. As the tournament now operates on a regional structure, with no overall winner, Warwickshire, who won in 2019, were the final national champions.

The competition formed the women's county structure with the 50-over Women's County Championship between 2009 and 2019. It has also ran alongside composite and regional tournaments such as the Super Fours, the Women's Cricket Super League and, currently, the Rachael Heyhoe Flint Trophy and the Charlotte Edwards Cup. Following the ending of the Women's County Championship in 2019, various counties set up regional tournaments such as the Women's London Championship and the East of England Women's County Championship; however, the Twenty20 Cup is now the only official county-based competition in England.

Structure
The Women's Twenty20 Cup has varying formats and number of teams over its history. In 2009, 32 teams took part divided into eight tiered divisions of four, with the winners of Division 1 being crowned the Champions. In 2010, teams were divided into three regions (Midlands & North, South and South & West), and then further divided into divisions within their regions. The best-performing teams across the three Division Ones progressed to Finals Day. This format was retained until the end of the 2013 season.

In 2014, teams were divided into four divisions, which were further divided into regional groups of three (and one group of four) each. Each team then progressed into a second group stage to play against teams that finished in the same position in the first round, with the winner of Round 2 Group 1A being crowned the Champions. From 2015, teams were divided into four divisions with promotion and relegation, with the winner of Division 1 winning the tournament. In 2017, the number of division was reduced to three, with this format retained until the end of the 2019 season.

The tournament was cancelled in 2020 due to the COVID-19 pandemic. In 2021, due to ongoing concerns with the pandemic, as well as limited travel costs, the tournament was organised on a regional basis, with six groups of six, and no overall national winner. In 2022, the tournament remained organised on a regional basis, with teams now divided into eight groups.

Current teams
In 2023, the 35 teams that compete in the tournament are organised into 8 regional groups. The teams are divided as follows:

Former teams

Roll of Honour

See also
Women's County Championship
Women's Cricket Super League
Super Fours

Notes

References

Women's Twenty20 Cup
English domestic cricket competitions
Women's cricket competitions in England
Recurring sporting events established in 2009
2009 establishments in England
Twenty20 cricket leagues